Bruno Kuzuhara and Coleman Wong defeated Alex Michelsen and Adolfo Daniel Vallejo in the final, 6–3, 7–6(7–3) to win the boys' doubles title at the 2022 Australian Open. Wong became the first Hongkonger win an Australian Open title, and the first Hongkonger to win two titles at majors, having previously won the junior doubles at the 2021 US Open.

David Ionel and Leandro Riedi were the defending champions, but both players were no longer eligible to participate in junior events.

Seeds

Draw

Finals

Top half

Bottom half

References

External links 
 Draw at itftennis.com
 Draw at ausopen.com

2022
Boys' Doubles